The Secretary of the Provincial Committee of the League of Communists of Kosovo was the head of the League of Communists of Kosovo, heading the Provincial Committee of the Party. The holder of the office was, for a significant period, the de facto most influential politician in the Socialist Autonomous Province of Kosovo, an autonomous province of Serbia within Yugoslavia. The official name of the office was changed in June 1982 from "Secretary of the Provincial Committee" to President of the Presidency of the Provincial Committee of the League of Communists of Kosovo (Kryetari i Kryesisë së Komitetit Krahinor të Lidhja e Komunistëve të Kosovës).

The League of Communists of Kosovo was also an organization subordinate to the federal-level League of Communists of Yugoslavia and the republic-level League of Communists of Serbia. Between September 1944 and September 1952, the former was named the Communist Party of Kosovo (being part of the larger Communist Party of Yugoslavia), until both parties were renamed "League of Communists" in 1952.

List

Here follows a list of the twelve officeholders (and one more acting):

See also
League of Communists of Kosovo
League of Communists of Yugoslavia
Socialist Autonomous Province of Kosovo
President of Kosovo
Prime Minister of Kosovo
List of presidents of the Assembly of Kosovo
Chairman of the Assembly of Kosovo
List of heads of state of Yugoslavia
Prime Minister of Yugoslavia
Politics of Kosovo

References

Communism in Kosovo
League of Communists of Kosovo politicians